Miličić is a South Slavic surname. It may refer to:

 Aleksandar Miličić (1946–2021), Serbian football player and coach
 Ante Milicic (born 1974), Croatian-Australian football (soccer) player
 Bogdan Miličić, (born 1989), Serbian footballer
 Boris Miličić (born 1979), Serbian footballer
 Darko Miličić (born 1985), Serbian basketball player
 Dragoslav Miličić, Serbian entrepreneur and politician
 Igor Miličić (born 1976), Croatian basketball player and coach
 Neva Milicic Müller (born 1943), Chilean child psychologist

See also
 

Croatian surnames
Serbian surnames
Matronymic surnames